Survivor South Africa: Philippines is the sixth season of the South African reality competition show Survivor South Africa. The season was filmed in January and February 2018 in the Palawan province of the Philippines and aired weekly on M-Net from May 3, 2018 until the live finale on August 16, 2018, when Tom Swartz was crowned Sole Survivor over Jeanne Michel in a vote of 6-1. It was the fourth season hosted by Nico Panagio, and was produced by Afrokaans Film & Television.

This season incorporated several format changes and twists from international editions. This was the first Survivor South Africa season to last 39 days — the typical length of the American series — instead of the 27 or 29 day format used in earlier seasons. This season also featured a tribe swap during which a third tribe was introduced alongside the original two starting tribes (as first seen in Survivor: Cambodia), a Tribal Council vote to swap members on two tribes (as seen in the 2016 season of Australian Survivor) and a vote to remove a jury member (as first seen in Survivor: Kaôh Rōng). This season also provided the first instance on the South African franchise of rock draw tie-breaker at Tribal Council. While the rule change to the tie-break rules was alluded to on Survivor South Africa: Champions, this is the first instance that a tie was broken by rock draw instead of vote count-backs or tiebreaker challenges.

Contestants
The cast is composed of 18 players, initially split into two tribes containing nine members each; Luzon and Mindanao, named after the two largest islands of the Philippines. Adrian "Ace" Chetty won a wildcard competition to compete in the season.

On Day 9, the castaways were divided into three tribes with the creation of the Visayas tribe, named after the third largest region of islands in the Philippines. Day 16 saw two tribes voting one of their own at Tribal Council to swap tribes, bringing another tribemate along with them. Day 22 saw the three tribes merge into the Araw tribe, named after the Filipino word for "sun".

Notes

Future appearances
Antoinette 'Toni' Tebbutt, Palesa Tau, Pheko 'PK' Phetoe, Seamus Holmes and Tevin Naidu competed again in Survivor South Africa: Return of the Outcasts in 2022.

Season summary
The new 18 castaways were divided into two tribes: Luzon and Mindanao. Initially Luzon were divided by alliances trying to win over Ace's loyalty, while Mindanao dominated in the early challenges. A tribe expansion saw Mindanao acquire majority over the original two tribes, while a third tribe called Visayas saw Tom, Chané, Palesa, and Vusi in an uneasy truce from their original Luzon days. Even with a surprise vote shuffle, the Mindanaos diverted from one another in preparation for the merge. Jeanne, Katinka, and Werner saw comfort with new tribal lines, while Toni and PK sought to protect Mindanao Strong by cutting potential strategic threats.

At the Merge, the Visayas tribe offered to the original Mindanao alliance an easy first vote of Tom. However, Werner used this opportunity to recruit Tom to eliminate the remaining Visayas members. With two idols in his possession, Werner became the leader of the majority alliance, using Annalize and Tom to systematically cut out the Visayas tribe and original Mindanao members, PK and Toni. As Werner accumulated power, the women in his alliance started to turn on him. When Katinka let slip to Tom of her and Annalize' plans, the men blindsided Katinka at the final five. At final four, however, after all advantages and idols had expired, Jeanne rallied Annalize and Tom to eliminate Werner as the biggest challenge and jury threat. After back to back surprise immunity challenge wins, Jeanne took Tom to the end to face the Final Tribal Council, and removed Werner from the jury itself. The jury was mostly able to set aside differences to respect Tom's scrambling underdog game more so than Jeanne's quietly hesitant strategic game, resulting in a victory for Tom by a vote of 6-1.

Notes

Episodes

Voting history

References

External links

Survivor South Africa seasons
2018 South African television seasons
Television shows filmed in the Philippines